Irgen Gioro is a Manchu clan and family name, which was officially categorized as a "notable clan", and member of the eight great houses of the Manchu nobility in Qing dynasty. Sibe and Nanai people also has Irgen Gioro as their family name.

History
The origin of Irgen Gioro does not have a decisive conclusion. According to a famous anecdote, the ancestors of Irgen Gioro were the emperors Huizong, Qinzong, and other imperial family members of Song dynasty who were captured by the Jurchens in the Jingkang Incident of the Jin–Song wars. The Manchu emperors had also bestowed their family name to the founding ministers or generals who rendered outstanding service to the empire. In order to differentiate from Aisin Gioro the Manchu imperial family, "Irgen" was added with the meaning of "regular citizen" or "common people" and the implication of "non-imperial".

At the early period of Manchu Empire, Irgen Gioro were recorded as 340 households. They mainly distributed in Muki, Yehe, Jamuhu, Singgan, Sarkū, Hunehe, Yarhū, Girin Ula, Sunggari Ula, Akuri, Fe Ala, Hada, etc. The whole clan had many famous hereditary noblemen in the empire, such as Viscount First Class Arjin and Asan of Muki; Viscount Third Class Turusi, Baron Second Class Fiyangū of Yehe and so on. Among these noble families, Muki Irgen Gioro (also known as "Muki Gioro") was considered as the most politically influential one because of their important contribution to the Manchu Empire's establishment. Irgen Gioro also earned numerous titles of minor nobility and 40 hereditary peers as captains in Banner Armies.

There were few instance of name change of the clan (e.g. The Manchu clan of Bayara, Monggero, Donggo, Laibu, and Siburu came from the Irgen Gioro who settled in these places.) at the early Qing Dynasty because of migration. Due to the adoption of Chinese culture during the mid to late Qing dynasty, most of Irgen Gioro chose Zhao (；), the first surname in the famous Hundred Family Surnames, as their Chinese family name. It was according to the Chinese homophone and their anecdote of origin. Other utilization of Chinese family names, such as Tong, Gu, Yi, Sa, Gong, Zhao (兆), Cao, Bao, Zhe, Xi, Yu, Ge, Ma, Gao, Hu, Bai, and Chen, are also reported.

Notable figures

Males

Ministers and Generals

Prince Consort

Modern

Females
Imperial Consort
 Noble Consort
 Noble Consort Xun (1758–1798), the Qianlong Emperor's noble consort

 Imperial Concubine
 Imperial Concubine Rong (1837–1869), the Xianfeng Emperor's noble lady

 First Class Female Attendant
 First Class Female Attendant Ping (d. 1856), the Xianfeng Emperor's first class female attendant

Princess Consort
 Primary Consort
 Yunzhi's first primary consort, the mother of Princess (1688–1711), Princess (1689–1716), Lady (1691–1723), Lady (1692–1711) and Hongyu (1696–1718)
 Yunhu's first primary consort, the mother of Honglong (1727–1784), Princess (1730–1775) and Princess (1731–1785)
 Yongcheng's primary consort

 Secondary Consort
 Nurhaci's secondary consort, the mother of Princess (1587–1646) and Abatai (1589–1646)
 Yunti's secondary consort, the mother of first daughter (1705–1706), Princess (1706–1773) and Hongying (1707–1771)
 Yonghuang's secondary consort, the mother of Mian'en (1747–1822)

 Concubine
 Nurhaci's concubine, the mother of Lady (1604–1685)
 Hong Taiji's concubine, the mother of Cangšu (1637–1700)
 Hooge's concubine, the mother of Shushu (1645–1685)
 Yunzhi's concubine, the mother of Princess (1702–1746)
 Yunyou's concubine, the mother of third son (1702–1703) and sixth daughter (1709–1710)
 Yunti's concubine, the mother of Princess (1753–1776)

See also
 Manchu people
 Manchu name
 List of Manchu clans

References

Citations

Sources 

 
 
 
 
 
 
 
 
 
 
 

 
 
 
 
 
 
 
 
 
 
 

 
Manchu noble families
Surnames
Gioro clans